Mr. Music is a 1950 film starring Bing Crosby and Nancy Olson, directed by Richard Haydn, and released by Paramount Pictures. It is based on the play Accent on Youth  written by Samson Raphaelson. Filming took place from October to December 1949 in Hollywood.

Plot
New York theater producer Alex Conway travels with composer Paul Merrick to Lawford College, Paul's alma mater, where one of his musicals is being revived by the students. The current campus hero is handsome athlete Jefferson Blake, so Katherine Holbrook, class valedictorian and chairman of the welcoming committee for returning alumni, asks Paul to work in a phrase about Jeff in one of his songs. Paul balks at the suggestion, but Kate's matter-of-fact manner leaves no room for discussion.

Paul is persuaded to take part in the show, and he sings "And You'll Be Home". Lawrence Welk's champagne lady, Norma Zimmer sings the obligato, while sitting next to Bing during the song. After the show, Paul and Alex return to New York, and although Paul is broke, he would rather play golf than work. When he asks Alex for a $15,000 advance against his next musical, which Alex intends to produce with financing from multi-millionaire Tippy Carpenter, Alex agrees on condition that Paul take on a secretary, who will make sure that he works and will not squander the money. Paul laughingly accepts, but has second thoughts when he finds that Alex has hired the ever-serious Kate.

Kate continually hounds him to work, but Paul snubs her efforts so that he can play golf and entertain Lorna Marvis, his girlfriend. Frustrated by her lack of success, Kate, an aspiring psychiatrist, accuses Paul of being afraid of failure. Paul intends to fire Kate, but feels guilty because he would be breaking his agreement with Alex.

Lorna announces her intention to marry Tippy for his money. Paul then discovers that Kate and her Aunt Amy have moved into the guest room of his penthouse apartment. Paul gets to work composing a new score, and when Jeff comes to town, Paul encourages him to take Kate out. For the first time, Jeff sees Kate's charms and kisses her, even though it means breaking training. However, Kate discovers that she is more interested in Paul, who is older, than in Jeff.

After three weeks, Paul throws a party to celebrate the fact that he has written eight songs and completed the score for the musical revue, Mr. Music. The day after the party, Jeff tells Paul that he is losing competitions because he cannot stop thinking about Kate, even though he knows Kate is in love with Paul. Paul is surprised to hear about Kate's feelings, and when Lorna returns to him, and they become engaged, he tells Kate about Jeff's visit, and that she should pursue someone closer to her own age.

Kate is devastated, and plans to quit, but refrains when she learns that Tippy has pulled his money from the show. Aunt Amy tries to interest her wealthy friend, Jerome Thisbee (Richard Haydn using the pseudonym Claud Curdle), in backing the show, but Alex and Paul are disappointed when Thisbee offers only $300, not the $300,000 they need. Kate then announces her plan to return to graduate school, but instead returns to Lawford after Paul's butler, "Cupcake" Haggerty, brings news that the Friars' Club has agreed to help them.

Some time later, Paul brings Alex to Lawford to let him in on the surprise: The college students, aided by name performers such as comedian Groucho Marx, Metropolitan Opera singer Dorothy Kirsten, dancers Marge, and Gower Champion, who portray themselves along with the singing group The Merry Macs, have put on Mr. Music for the benefit of several potential backers.

Although the backers refuse to finance the show with Alex as producer, Thisbee comes through with a certified check for $300,000. Lorna, who realizes she is more interested in money than Paul, ends their engagement and asks Kate to return the ring. As Kate has rejected Jeff, who is back on a winning streak, she asks Paul if she can keep the ring, and when he consents, they become engaged.

Cast

Bing Crosby as Paul Merrick
Nancy Olson as Katherine Holbrook
Charles Coburn as Alex Conway
Ruth Hussey as Lorna Marvis
Robert Stack as Jefferson Blake
Tom Ewell as "Cupcake" Haggerty
Ida Moore as Aunt Amy
Charles Kemper as Mr. Danforth
Donald Woods as Tippy Carpenter
Richard Haydn (aka Claud Curdle) as Jerome Thisbee
Irving Bacon as Jewelry Salesman
Norma Zimmer as Singer (uncredited)
Dave Barbour as Guitarist (uncredited)

and featuring as themselves:
Marge Champion
Gower Champion
Groucho Marx
Dorothy Kirsten
Peggy Lee
The Merry Macs

Reception
Bosley Crowther of The New York Times in his review of December 21, 1950 wrote: "To brighten the Christmas season, our old friend, Bing Crosby, is in town in a role (and an entertainment) that fits him—and he it—like a glove. In Paramount’s Mr. Music, which came to the Paramount yesterday ... Mr. Music may not stack up with the best of the Crosby films, but it is certainly a contemporary achievement that the master may lean happily upon."

Variety concluded: "Despite a contrived story, the ingredients are sufficiently well mixed to make Mr. Music a box office winner."

Soundtrack
"Once More the Blue and White" sung by Bing Crosby
"Milady" sung by students
"And You'll Be Home" sung by Bing Crosby and chorus, and again by chorus.
"High on the List" sung by Bing Crosby
"Wouldn't It Be Funny" sung by Bing Crosby
"Accidents Will Happen" sung by Bing Crosby, and again by Bing Crosby and Dorothy Kirsten
"Wasn't I There?" a few lines sung by Bing Crosby
"Life Is So Peculiar" sung by Bing Crosby and Peggy Lee, also by The Merry Macs, and again by Bing Crosby and Groucho Marx
"Mr. Music" sung by chorus

All of the songs were written by Jimmy Van Heusen (music) and Johnny Burke (lyrics).

Bing Crosby recorded six of the songs for Decca Records, and these were issued on a 78rpm album titled Songs from Mr. Music. Crosby's songs were also included in the Bing's Hollywood series.

Primary crew
Director: Richard Haydn
Producer: Robert L. Welch
Assistant Director: Harry Caplan
2nd Assistant Director: Danny McCauley
Dialogue Director: James Vincent
Director of Photography: George Barnes
Composer: Jimmy Van Heusen
Lyricist: Johnny Burke
Choreography: Gower Champion

References

External links

1950 films
1950 comedy films
American comedy films
American films based on plays
American black-and-white films
1950s English-language films
1950s American films